Baggott is a surname. Notable people with the surname Baggott or Baggot include:

Elkan Baggott (born 2002), Indonesian footballer
Jack Baggott (1906–1995), Australian rules footballer
Jim Baggott (born 1957), British science writer
Julianna Baggott (born 1969), American novelist and poet
Louis Baggott (1891–1965), Anglican priest
 Martin Baggott, a member of the Applejacks
Matt Baggott (born 1959), Chief Constable of the Police Service of Northern Ireland
Ron Baggott (1917–2013), Australian rules footballer
Matt Baggott (born 1994), 2250 local, real estate agent

See also 
Baggott Ridge in Antarctica
Baggot Street in Ireland